Growth Without End is an EP by Pyrrhon, released on June 2, 2015 by Handshake Inc.

Track listing

Personnel
Adapted from the Growth Without End liner notes.

Pyrrhon
 Alex Cohen – drums
 Dylan DiLella – electric guitar
 Erik Malave – bass guitar
 Doug Moore – vocals

Production and additional personnel
 Caroline Harrison – cover art, design
 Ryan Jones – recording, mixing
 Colin Marston – mastering

Release history

References

External links 
 
 Growth Without End at Bandcamp

2015 EPs
Pyrrhon (band) albums